Eliza Island is located in the western part of Bellingham Bay in the U.S. state of Washington. It lies just east of the southern part of Lummi Island, in Whatcom County. Its population was ten persons .

The island was named by Charles Wilkes during the Wilkes Expedition of 1838–1842. One of the few names given by Wilkes that does not honor either members of his crew or American naval officers, Eliza refers to Francisco de Eliza, the Spanish commander of a 1791 expedition to the Pacific Northwest.  Wilkes may have named the island for his daughter or his sister, both named Eliza.

The south end of Eliza island is home to commercial and recreational crabbing.

Eliza Island has a small airstrip that can only be used during daylight hours, and one dock which is used strictly for loading and unloading. It is a private island with only about three people who live there year-round. Private generators provide electricity, and a water desalinization system is used to provide water to the residents. Only people who are 55 or older or disabled are allowed to use motor transportation such as a John Deere Gator or golf cart; everyone else can only go by foot or perhaps by bicycle. A designated swimming beach on the south side of the island is sandy and somewhat shallow.

References

External links 
Eliza Island: Blocks 1000 thru 1011, Census Tract 109, Whatcom County, Washington United States Census Bureau
Aerial photo

Landforms of Whatcom County, Washington
Islands of Washington (state)
Pacific islands of Washington (state)
Private islands of Washington (state)